Ceratocarpus is a genus of flowering plants in the family Amaranthaceae. It has only one currently accepted species, Ceratocarpus arenarius, found in Bulgaria, Romania, Crimea, Russia, Anatolia, the Caucasus, Iran, Afghanistan, Pakistan, Central Asia, the Altai, western Siberia, Xinjiang in China, and Mongolia. A bushy herbaceous plant, no more than 30 cm tall (or wide), it is a valuable fodder for sheep, goats and horses, and it grows well in degraded and trampled soils.

Species
Only one species is currently accepted, Ceratocarpus arenarius, but a number of names have been previously associated with Ceratocarpus:

Ceratocarpus arenarius subsp. utriculosus (Bluket ex Krylov) Takht.
Ceratocarpus caput-medusae Bluket
Ceratocarpus maritimus Pall. ex M.Bieb.
Ceratocarpus salinus Pall.
Ceratocarpus turkestanicus Sav.-Rycz.
Ceratocarpus utriculosus Bluket ex Krylov

References

Chenopodioideae
Monotypic Caryophyllales genera
Plants described in 1753
Taxa named by Carl Linnaeus